The IFBB Arnold Sports Festival, also known as the Arnold Schwarzenegger Sports Festival, is an annual multi-sport event consisting of professional bodybuilding (Arnold Classic), strongman (Arnold Strongman Classic), fitness, figure and bikini weekend expo. It was established in 1989 and is named after Arnold Schwarzenegger. The main event is held annually around late February or early March in Columbus, Ohio, by the International Federation of BodyBuilding & Fitness (IFBB). It is considered the second-most-prestigious event in professional men's bodybuilding, physique, figure and bikini after Joe Weider's Olympia; and until 2014, when the Ms. International competition was dropped, it was the second-most-prestigious event in professional female bodybuilding.

History
A lucrative sports competition, the ASF offers a number of large prizes. Most notably, first prize in bodybuilding consists of a $130,000 check, a Hummer vehicle, and an Audemars Piguet watch. Since the Mr. Olympia bodybuilding title pre-dates and offers higher prize money than the ASF, a rivalry in prestige and popularity has sprung up. The ASF is always hotly contested, often with one or two competition points separating the winners.

All-star cheerleading competitions span a two-day period (usually all day Saturday, and to midday Sunday). More than 4,000 competitors entered the cheerleading event in 2014. Each team (of 15–30 cheerleaders) prepares to perform a two and one-half minute routine. After the teams' routines are complete, they are scored by a panel of judges, each judge being an expert on one area of cheerleading (jumps, tumbling, stunting, etc.). Once scoring is complete, every team entered in the competition is called to the mat for awards, during which each team has a chance of winning multiple times. The ASF's awards consist of the following: National Champion jackets, trophies for every team, custom medals, limited edition patches and Grand Champion banners, and possible partial or full paid bid to Cheerleading World contests.

On June 7, 2013, the ASF's event promoter, Jim Lorimer, announced that from 2014 on, the ASF's "212" (a professional, men’s bodybuilding division) would permanently replace the Ms. International women’s bodybuilding competition. Lorimer, in a statement, said “The Arnold Sports Festival was proud to support women’s bodybuilding through the Ms. International for the past quarter century, but in keeping with demands of our fans, the time has come to introduce the Arnold Classic 212 beginning in 2014. We are excited to create a professional competitive platform for some of the IFBB Pro League’s most popular competitors.”

On March 3, 2020 Ohio governor Mike DeWine cancelled most of the Arnold Sports Festival due to the oncoming COVID-19 pandemic in Ohio, before any cases or deaths had been reported. The cancellation was widely regarded as 'radical' at the time.

Champions

Arnold Classic International
Arnold Classic is also held as:
 Arnold Classic Europe in Spain (since 2011)
 Arnold Classic South America in Brazil (since 2013)
 Arnold Classic Australia in Australia (since 2015)
 Arnold Classic Africa in South Africa (since 2016)
 Arnold Classic Asia in Hong Kong (only 2016)
 Arnold Classic UK in England (since 2021)
 Arnold Classic Russia in Russia

Winners

See also
 Statue of Arnold Schwarzenegger, a statue at the event venue
 Arnold Strongman Classic
 Arnold Pro Strongwoman
 Ms. International

References

External links
 
 

1989 establishments in Ohio
Arnold Schwarzenegger
Cheerleading competitions
Multi-sport events in the United States
Professional bodybuilding competitions
Female professional bodybuilding competitions
Recurring sporting events established in 1989
Sports in Columbus, Ohio
Sports festivals in the United States